The Humanitarian League was a British radical advocacy group formed by Henry S. Salt and others to promote the principle that it is wrong to inflict avoidable suffering on any sentient being. It was based in London and operated between 1891 and 1919.

Background 
Howard Williams, the author of The Ethics of Diet (1883), a history of vegetarianism, proposed in the book the concept of a "humane society with a wider scope than any previously existing body". William's idea was developed by fellow writer and advocate, Henry S. Salt, in an 1889 article on humanitarianism.

History 
The League was formed by Henry S. Salt, who was also the General Secretary and Editor. Other founding members included Edward Maitland, Ernest Bell (Chairman), Howard Williams, Kenneth Romanes and Alice Lewis (Treasurer). The League's inaugural meeting, in 1891, was held at the house of Alice Lewis, 14 Park Square, London, who remained Treasurer for the League's entire existence. Many of its founders were also members of the Shelley Society.

Its aim was to enforce the principle that it is iniquitous to inflict avoidable suffering on any sentient being; their manifesto stated:The Humanitarian League has been established on the basis of an intelligible and consistent principle of humaneness – that it is iniquitous to inflict suffering, directly or indirectly, on any sentient being, except when self-defence or absolute necessity can justly be pleaded.The League opposed both corporal and capital punishment. Its other objectives included the banning of all hunting as a sport, and it was also strongly opposed to vivisection. The Humanitarian League thus anticipated the modern animal rights movement; many of its members were vegetarians. However, the League was not confined to animal protection. They were also responsible for the advancement of human rights. For example, they were largely behind the banning of flogging with birch in the Royal Navy in 1906 and campaigning to amend the law relating to imprisonment for debt and other non-criminal offences. The League also opposed flogging in schools, vaccinations because of the pain, and the wearing of feathers and fur.

The League spread its ideas through two journals, Humanity (1895–1902), which was later renamed The Humanitarian (1902–1919) and a quarterly The Humane Review (1900–1910).

During the First World War, the League's membership and output of publications were reduced in number.

The League closed down in 1919, following the death of Salt's wife.

Legacy 
In 2013, The Humanitarian League was registered as an organisation in Hong Kong. It operates alongside the Ernest Bell Library, republishing historical humanitarian pamphlets and books.

Notable people associated with the League 
Notable members and supporters of the League included Annie Besant, W. H. Hudson, Sydney Olivier, George Bernard Shaw, Edward Carpenter, Colonel William Lisle Blenkinsopp Coulson, John Galsworthy, Leo Tolstoy, J. Howard Moore, Ralph Waldo Trine, Ernest Howard Crosby, Alice Park, Clarence Darrow, Keir Hardie, Thomas Hardy, Bertram Lloyd, Edith Carrington, Christabel Pankhurst, Tom Mann, Enid Stacy, Carl Heath, Thomas Baty, George Ives, John Dillon, Lizzy Lind af Hageby, Stella Browne, Charlotte Despard, Isabella Ford, Anne Cobden-Sanderson, Michael Davitt, Alfred Russel Wallace, G. W. Foote, Conrad Noel, John Page Hopps, Josiah Oldfield, Jessey Wade (Honorary Secretary of the Children’s Department; 1906–1919), Henry John Williams (Humane Diet department) and Henry B. Amos.

Publications

Books
 Moore, J. Howard. The Universal Kinship (Humanitarian League, 1906)

Pamphlets
 Salt, Henry S. Literae Humaniores: An Appeal to Teachers (William Reeves, 1894)
Collinson, Joseph. The Fate of the Fur Seal (William Reeves; Humanitarian League, 1902)
Dickerson, Philip. The Eton College Hare-Hunt (Humanitarian League, 1904)
Salt, Henry S. Humanitarianism: Its General Principles and Progress (Humanitarian League, 1906)
Salt, Henry S. The Case Against Corporal Punishment (Humanitarian League, 1912)
Salt, Henry S. (ed.) Killing for Sport: Essays by Various Writers (G. Bell & Sons, 1915)

See also
 Progressive League, a later group operating on the same basis 
 Ethical Union, now known as Humanists UK, its sister organisation
 List of animal rights groups

References

External links
Aims and objects of the Humanitarian League
Humanitarian League Publications
The Humanitarian League, 1891–1919
Biography of Henry S. Salt
The Humane Review:
Volume 2; 1901
Volume 3: April, 1902 to January, 1903
Volume 7: April, 1906 to January, 1907

1891 establishments in England
1919 disestablishments in England
Animal rights organizations
Animal welfare organisations based in the United Kingdom
Anti–death penalty organizations
Anti-hunting organizations
Anti-vaccination organizations
Anti-vivisection organizations
Defunct organisations based in London
Organizations established in 1891
Political advocacy groups in England
Prison reform